"Imminent lawless action" is one of several legal standards American courts use to determine whether certain speech is protected under the First Amendment of the United States Constitution. The standard was first established in 1969 in the United States Supreme Court case Brandenburg v. Ohio.

History 
Brandenburg clarified what constituted a "clear and present danger", the standard established by Schenck v. United States (1919), and overruled Whitney v. California (1927), which had held that speech that merely advocated violence could be made illegal. Under the imminent lawless action test, speech is not protected by the First Amendment if the speaker intends to incite a violation of the law that is both imminent and likely. While the precise meaning of "imminent" may be ambiguous in some cases, the court provided later clarification in Hess v. Indiana (1973) in which the court found that Hess's words were protected under "his rights to free speech", in part, because his speech "amounted to nothing more than advocacy of illegal action at some indefinite future time," and therefore did not meet the imminence requirement.

The two legal prongs that constitute incitement of imminent lawless action are as follows:

Advocacy of force or criminal activity does not receive First Amendment protections if (1) the advocacy is directed to inciting or producing imminent lawless action, and (2) is likely to incite or produce such action.

Quotation

See also
 Hit Man: A Technical Manual for Independent Contractors
Clear and present danger
List of United States Supreme Court cases, volume 395
Shouting fire in a crowded theater
Threatening the president of the United States
Abrams v. United States, 
Brandenburg v. Ohio 
Chaplinsky v. New Hampshire, 
Dennis v. United States 
Feiner v. New York, 
Hess v. Indiana 
Korematsu v. United States 
Masses Publishing Co. v. Patten (1917)
Sacher v. United States,  
Schenck v. United States 
Terminiello v. Chicago, 
Whitney v. California,

References

Further reading

External links
 Hess v. Indiana, 414 U.S. 105 (1973)
 Advocacy of Unlawful Action and the Incitement Test

Illegal speech in the United States
American legal terminology